The Angelina River Bridge was a historic bridge on U.S. Route 59 (US 59) over the Angelina River in Lufkin, Texas. It was built in 1935 and added to the National Register of Historic Places in 1988.

It had square balusters and rails with chamfered edges.

The bridge was demolished and replaced with a new bridge in 1998.

See also

National Register of Historic Places listings in Angelina County, Texas
List of bridges on the National Register of Historic Places in Texas

References

Road bridges on the National Register of Historic Places in Texas
Bridges completed in 1935
Transportation in Angelina County, Texas
Buildings and structures in Angelina County, Texas
U.S. Route 59
Bridges of the United States Numbered Highway System
Lufkin, Texas
National Register of Historic Places in Angelina County, Texas